Bahare Arvin is an Iranian sociologist and reformist politician who is member of City Council of Tehran. She was a participant in 2007 World Economic Forum.

References

External links
 Official website

Living people
Iranian sociologists
Iranian women sociologists
Islamic Iran Participation Front politicians
Tehran Councillors 2017–
1982 births